The Marjory Stoneman Douglas House is a historic house at 3744 Stewart Avenue in Miami, Florida.  Built in 1926, it was the lifelong home of environmentalist Marjory Stoneman Douglas (1890-1998), who was nationally known for her efforts to preserve the Everglades of southern Florida.  The house was designated a National Historic Landmark in 2015.

Description and history
The Douglas House is located in Miami's Coconut Grove neighborhood, on the south side of Stewart Avenue, a short way west of Southwest 37th Street.  It is a single story wood-frame structure, its exterior finished in a variety of surfaces, including half-timbered stucco, brick, and wooden timbering.  It has a T-shaped plan, and stylistically resembles an English country cottage, with a curving roof made of steam-shaped wooden shingles.  Exterior wood is typically cypress, and windows are irregularly placed.  The house is set in a densely-planted yard, designed to afford some shade to the structure, and frequently obscuring its shape.  The interior is finished in hardwood flooring, with plaster walls, and plaster ceilings with exposed beams.

The house was built in 1926 to a design by architect George Hyde, creating what Douglas described as "a workshop, more than a house".  It was here that she did much of her intellectual work and writing, including important works such as The Everglades: River of Grass, a seminal 1947 work describing the declining quality of the Everglades, even as some preservation actions were taking place, including the formation of Everglades National Park, a move that she championed.  Douglas's home was a frequent meeting point for area conservationists.  It was purchased by the state in 1991, as the home of "one of Florida's most distinguished citizens."

See also

List of National Historic Landmarks in Florida
National Register of Historic Places listings in Miami, Florida

References

National Historic Landmarks in Florida
Houses on the National Register of Historic Places in Florida
Houses completed in 1926
Houses in Miami
National Register of Historic Places in Miami
1926 establishments in Florida